The Heritage Hjemkomst Interpretive Center, commonly known as the Hjemkomst Center, is a museum in Moorhead, Minnesota. Hjemkomst Center first opened in 1985 and serves as a home to Hjemkomst Viking Ship, Hopperstad Stave Church replica, quarterly museum exhibits, and county archives.  In 2009, the Clay County Historical Society (which was founded in 1932) and the Heritage Hjemkomst Interpretive Center merged to form the Historical and Cultural Society of Clay County.

Hjemkomst

Hjemkomst, which means "Homecoming" in Norwegian, is a replica Viking ship that is permanently housed in the center of the museum. The ship is a full-scale replica of the Gokstad Viking ship that was discovered in Norway in 1880. The idea for building Hjemkomst was that of Robert Asp (1923–1980), a guidance counselor at Moorhead Junior High School. Construction on Hjemkomst began in 1974 at the Leslie Welter Potato Warehouse in Hawley, Minnesota. The warehouse site was then transformed into the Hawley Shipyard during the construction. That same year, Asp became diagnosed with leukemia; however he still continued to build the ship; he had help from other volunteers.

In July 1980 the Hawley Shipyard was torn down for the removal and christening of the completed ship. Hjemkomst was shipped overnight to Duluth, Minnesota, on August 5, 1980. Asp held the rank as captain during the ship's maiden voyage throughout Lake Superior until his death four months later on December 27, 1980.
In May 1982, Asp's three sons and daughter along with eight members of Hjemkomst crew decided to sail Hjemkomst to Norway, which was Asp's original dream. The ship departed Duluth on May 11, 1982 and arrived in New York City on June 8, 1982 and arrived in Bergen, Norway 19 July and on August 9, 1982 the ship arrived in Oslo. The ship stayed in Oslo for a year until it was transported back to Minnesota on MV Brunto.

Hopperstad Stave Church Replica
The Hopperstad Stave Church Replica is a replica of a Norwegian stave church located on the grounds of the Hjemkomst Center. The church was built in 1998 by Guy Paulson and was constructed of cedar, redwood, and pine. It is a full-scale replica of the 12th Century Hopperstad Stave Church in Vik, Norway. The  church serves as a reminder of the Scandinavian heritage in the Red River Valley.

References

External links

Viking Ship Hjemkomst Center, Fargo-Moorhead 
Historical and Cultural Society of Clay County
story from 2012

1985 establishments in Minnesota
Ethnic museums in Minnesota
Norwegian-American museums
Moorhead, Minnesota
Museums established in 1985
Museums in Clay County, Minnesota
Norwegian-American culture in Minnesota
Viking Age museums